Monte Compatri-Pantano is the eastern terminus of Line C of the Rome Metro. It is located in Pantano (a frazione of the comune of Monte Compatri), along the Via Casilina; thus being the only Roman Metro station outside the Rome municipality border.

The station used to serve as the terminus of the Rome–Pantano railway (the urban section of which now forms the Rome–Giardinetti railway). The former railway station was closed in 2008 so as to be rebuilt into the terminus of the new Metro line; it re-opened on 9 November 2014.

External links

Rome Metro Line C stations
Railway stations opened in 2014
2014 establishments in Italy
Monte Compatri
Railway stations in Italy opened in the 21st century